Vektor may refer to:

Firearms
SR-1 Vektor, a Russian semi-automatic pistol
Vektor, the small arms brand name of Denel Land Systems (DLS), a South African manufacturer of arms and military technology
Vektor CP1, a semi-automatic pistol
Vektor CR-21, a modern assault rifle
Vektor R4, an assault rifle
Vektor SP1, a 9mm pistol
Vektor SP2, a .40 caliber version of the SP1
Vektor SS-77, a general purpose machine gun
Vektor Y3 AGL, an automatic grenade launcher
Vektor Z88, a Beretta used by the South African Police

Other uses
Vektor (band), from Tempe, Arizona
Vektor Grafix, a United Kingdom-based computer game development company
Radijus Vektor, a Serbian company providing cable television and high-speed Internet
Vektor (film), a 2010 Croatian film

See also
Vector (disambiguation)